Hans Jørgen Gottlieb Gundersen is a Danish stereology researcher.
He is employed as a professor at Aarhus University.

In January 2008 he received the August Krogh Prize "for his ground-breaking research in stereology for the spatial description and understanding of biological tissue". He was a recipient of the Novo Nordisk Prize.

External links 
 Hans Jørgen Gottlieb Gundersen, University web-page
 http://thiele.au.dk/events/conferences/2007/futurestereology/

References

Living people
Danish microbiologists
Year of birth missing (living people)
Danish educators